Killer Dill is a 1947 American film comedy directed by Lewis D. Collins set in 1931 during the Prohibition Era.

Plot 
Lingerie salesman Johnny Dill loses girlfriend Judy Parker to his longtime friend, the charming lawyer William T. Allen. And when he takes his assistant Millie Gardner to a movie, all she talks about is the manly gangster hero Big Nick Moronie. Discouraged that every woman seems to want something completely different from what he has to offer, Johnny decides to change his ways and become more of a tough gangster himself to improve his chances.

Johnny drops into a bar and plays out his new act in full, upsetting the Big Nick Moronie, who is considered to be "public enemy number 21." Big Nick has a beef with "public enemy number 24", Maboose, but when he sends his goon Little Joe to deal with him, Little Joe kills Big Nick instead in the gangster's own apartment, which is just across the hall from Johnny's. Little Joe doesn't know how to dispose of the body, so he puts it in one of Johnny's lingerie trunks.

Johnny finds the body, puts it in a car and drives off. The body falls out of the car when Johnny is chased by police. Everyone thinks Johnny is the one who offed Big Nick, and all over the news he is called "Killer Dill." Eventually he comes out of his hiding and a trial ensues. He is defended by his old friend William, and is found not guilty.

Everyone still believes he is the killer., He is now known as "public enemy number 21" after the person he supposedly killed. Big Nick's brother Louie is eager to get revenge. Johnny tries to team up with Maboose for protection. Little Joe is also making a deal with Maboose to get rid of Louie. Before Louie is killed, Johnny bumps into Little Joe and threatens him with a toy gun. Johnny makes him write a statement taking responsibility for the murder. Little Joe discovers that the gun is a toy and starts strangling Johnny, but Louie comes to the rescue. Little Joe is thrown out the window.

William, who has worked for Maboose all along, makes Johnny destroy the statement to not incriminate his boss. Judy finally sees what a stand-up guy Johnny really is. She breaks off her engagement to William, then proposes to Johnny.

Cast 
Stuart Erwin as Johnny 'Killer' Dill
Anne Gwynne as Judy Parker
Frank Albertson as William T. Allen
Mike Mazurki as Little Joe
Milburn Stone as Maboose
Dorothy Granger as Millie Gardner
Anthony Warde as Louie Moroni
Dewey Robinson as McGowan, house detective
Ben Welden as Big Nick Moroni
Julie Gibson as Joan, model
Shirley Hunter as Gloria
Lola Jensen as Other model with Joan
Margaret Zane as Girl with Gloria
Stanley Ross as Mushnose

Reception
The Los Angeles Times called the film "a trifle heavy handed".

External links

References

1947 films
American crime comedy films
1940s English-language films
American black-and-white films
1940s crime comedy films
Films set in 1931
Lippert Pictures films
1947 comedy films
1940s American films
English-language crime comedy films